Ruth Green may refer to:

 Ruth Hurmence Green, United States atheist and writer
 Ruth Rossi (River City), married name Ruth Green, character on the BBC Scotland television series River City